Lipocarpha is a genus of sedges known as halfchaff sedges. There are approximately 35 species and representatives can be found throughout the tropical and warmer temperate areas of Africa, Asia (China, India, Indonesia, etc.), Australia, North America, South America and various oceanic islands. These mostly are erect annual herbs (some perennials are known) growing 1 to 30 centimeters tall. The inflorescence consists of one to few spikes each containing many spirally arranged spikelets. The flower is entangled with two hyalin scales, a spikelet prophyll and a glume. These flower stands in the axil of a spikelet-bract.

Species include:

Lipocarpha abietina – tropical Africa
Lipocarpha albiceps – tropical Africa
Lipocarpha aristulata – western and central United States
Lipocarpha atra – tropical Africa
Lipocarpha barteri – tropical Africa
Lipocarpha chinensis – tropical Africa, Indian Subcontinent, China, Southeast Asia, New Guinea, Australia
Lipocarpha comosa – central and eastern Africa
Lipocarpha constricta – Ethiopia, Burundi
Lipocarpha crassicuspis – Senegal
Lipocarpha drummondii – eastern and southern United States
Lipocarpha echinus – Zambia
Lipocarpha filiformis – tropical Africa
Lipocarpha gracilis – western and central Africa, Indian Subcontinent, Thailand, Myanmar; naturalized in Brazil
Lipocarpha hemisphaerica   tropical and southern Africa; India, Thailand
Lipocarpha kernii – tropical Africa, India
Lipocarpha leucaspis – central Africa
Lipocarpha maculata – southeastern United States; Mexico, Central America, Cuba, Trinidad, South America
Lipocarpha mangarevica – Tuamotu
Lipocarpha mexicana – Mexico, Central America, northern South America, Madagascar
Lipocarpha micrantha – United States, Canada, West Indies, Latin America, Madagascar, Senegal, Southern Africa
Lipocarpha microcephala – China, Japan, Korea, Indochina, Indonesia, Philippines, New Guinea, Solomon Islands, Australia
Lipocarpha monostachya – central Africa
Lipocarpha nana – tropical and southern Africa; Madagascar
Lipocarpha occidentalis – Oregon, Washington, California
Lipocarpha perspicua – Angola
Lipocarpha prieuriana – tropical Africa
Lipocarpha pygmaea – Cambodia, Thailand, Myanmar
Lipocarpha raynaliana – India
Lipocarpha reddyi – India
Lipocarpha rehmannii – tropical and southern Africa; Madagascar
Lipocarpha robinsonii – Angola, Zambia
Lipocarpha salzmanniana – Veracruz, Central America, Cuba, Colombia, Venezuela, Guyana, Brazil
Lipocarpha schomburgkii – Venezuela, Guyana
Lipocarpha squarrosa – Indian Subcontinent, Himalayas, Indochina; naturalized in Java and Florida
Lipocarpha thermalis – Zaïre

References

External links
Jepson Manual Treatment
USDA Plants Profile
Lipocarpha of Zimbabwe

Cyperaceae
Cyperaceae genera